Veciana is a municipality in the comarca of the Anoia in Catalonia, Spain. The municipality is split into two parts, the bigger northern part containing Veciana village.

References

External links
 Government data pages 

Municipalities in Anoia